Gracca is a hamlet in Cornwall, England. It is about half a mile west of Bugle. According to the Post Office the 2011 census population was included in the civil parish of Pentewan Valley.

References

Hamlets in Cornwall